Hold Me Tight is a 1933 American pre-Code drama film directed by David Butler and written by Gladys Lehman. The film stars James Dunn, Sally Eilers, Frank McHugh and June Clyde. The film was released on May 20, 1933, by Fox Film Corporation.

Synopsis
Chuck and Molly are workers in a department store and get married. She plans to quit her job, only to discover that Dolan the malicious store detective who had designs on her, has arranged to have Chuck fired. Molly now has to support her husband on her pay from the store as he struggles to find a job.

Cast       
James Dunn as Chuck
Sally Eilers as Molly
Frank McHugh as Billy
June Clyde as Dottie
 Clay Clement  as Blair
 Noel Francis as Trudie 
 Dorothy Peterson as 	Mary Shane 
 Kenneth Thomson as 	Dolan

References

Bibliography
 Solomon, Aubrey. The Fox Film Corporation, 1915-1935. A History and Filmography. McFarland & Co, 2011.

External links
 

1933 films
1930s English-language films
Fox Film films
American drama films
1933 drama films
Films directed by David Butler
American black-and-white films
1930s American films